Christopher Drew is an American investigative reporter for The New York Times .  He  has written on the U.S. Navy SEALS' role in Afghanistan, on submarine espionage, on presidential campaigning, and other topics.

Career
Drew was a recipient of a George Polk Award in 2016 for reporting on the SEALS' SEAL Team 6 and on the killing of an Afghan in 2012.  According to James Barron, the journalists "wrote that SEAL teams had carried out thousands of dangerous raids but “also spurred recurring concerns about excessive killing and civilian deaths.”" He shared the award with journalists Nicholas Kulish, Mark Mazzetti, Matthew Rosenberg, Serge F. Kovaleski, Sean D. Naylor and John Ismay.  He spent two years in Afghanistan with two co-authors investigating the role of U.S. Navy SEALS.

Drew reported from Washington D.C. for ten years, twice winning White House Correspondents' Association awards for national reportage. He covered presidential candidate Barack Obama in 2008.

His book Blind Man's Bluff: The Untold Story of American Submarine Espionage, published by PublicAffairs, and co-authored with Sherry Sontag and with Annette Lawrence Drew, won an Investigative Reporters and Editors (IRE) certificate award in 1998.  The Chicago Tribune team used Freedom of Information Act requests and examined formerly secret and dangerous submarine military actions.  The book also won the Theodore and Franklin D. Roosevelt Prize in Naval History prize for the best book on American naval history published in 1998.  The Blind Man's Bluff was a best seller for almost a year. The History Channel based a two-hour documentary on it. Drew has given opinion and information on national security issues on many of the major television news shows and in documentaries for PBS and the Discovery Channel.

In 1996, he covered the Odwalla E. coli outbreak, finding that the Odwalla firm had relaxed its quality standards for incoming fruit and curbed the authority of its own safety program

For the Chicago Tribune, he wrote a series of articles in 1988 on the topic of "Cutting Corners in the Slaughterhouse".

Personal life and education
His hometown is New Orleans, Louisiana, to which he later returned to report on the Hurricane Katrina aftermath.  He graduated from Tulane University.  He is an adjunct faculty member of the Columbia University Graduate School of Journalism.

References

External links
Recent and archived news articles by Christopher Drew of The New York Times
Christopher Drew, at muckrack.com

American investigative journalists
The New York Times writers
Living people
Writers from Louisiana
Year of birth missing (living people)